Vantage is a census-designated place (CDP) in Kittitas County, Washington, United States. The population was 74 at the 2010 census.

History
The area around Vantage has been occupied by the Wanapum Native Americans since prehistory. A number of well-preserved rock-paintings have been found on the cliff walls. They also used the abundant petrified wood in the area for arrowheads and other tools. The site where these petroglyphs were found was inundated by the rising waters behind Wanapum Dam in the 1960s. About 60 of the more than 300 carvings were cut from the basalt cliff face and saved.  The nearby Ginkgo Petrified Forest site is one of the most unusual fossil forests in the world, and was designated a National Natural Landmark by the National Park Service in 1965.

In the early part of the 20th century, residents in nearby Ellensburg needed a more direct route when traveling east. A small ferry was established in 1914 to carry vehicle traffic across the Columbia River at Vantage. This ferry was really just a small barge with wooden ramps at either end, it carried only two cars at a time across the river. After several cars (some with occupants still in them) were lost overboard, the state highway department decided to construct a bridge over the Columbia.

In 1927, the  bridge was opened at Vantage. This was an important link in the Sunset Highway, the major east–west thoroughfare in Washington at the time (later U.S. Route 10, now Interstate 90). The construction of the bridge required workers to enter pressurized caissons  under the riverbed via airlocks. Some workers became seriously ill from the effects of the pressure. Once completed, the bridge had a  clearance on the center span, allowing for river traffic to pass under the bridge.

This cantilever bridge served at Vantage for 35 years, succeeded by the current bridge in 1962. The original was dismantled and moved to the crossing at Lyons Ferry, where it stands today as the oldest ( years) extant steel cantilever bridge in Washington, and is listed in the National Register of Historic Places.

With completion of the Wanapum Dam in the early 1960s, the townsite was relocated further up the hill above the rising water to the current location.

Geography 
Vantage is located at  (46.946710, -119.991758) along the Columbia River.

The original town of Vantage was flooded by the Columbia River when the Wanapum Dam was placed into operation.

Climate

Demographics
As of the census of 2000, there were 70 people, 25 households, and 20 families residing in the CDP. The racial makeup of the CDP was 22.86% White, 1.43% Pacific Islander, 2.86% from other races, and 11.43% from two or more races. Hispanic or Latino of any race were 84.29% of the population. Besides these populations, approximately 2,000 agricultural workers live in the Vantage area, and approximately 72.8% of are migratory.

There were 25 households, out of which 28.0% had children under the age of 18 living with them, 68.0% were married couples living together, 4.0% had a female householder with no husband present, and 20.0% were non-families. 20.0% of all households were made up of individuals, and none had someone living alone who was 65 years of age or older. The average household size was 2.80 and the average family size was 3.25.

In the CDP, the population was spread out, with 24.3% under the age of 18, 15.7% from 18 to 24, 21.4% from 25 to 44, 32.9% from 45 to 64, and 5.7% who were 65 years of age or older. The median age was 36 years. For every 100 females, there were 105.9 males. For every 100 females age 18 and over, there were 103.8 males.

The median income for a household in the CDP was $26,250, and the median income for a family was $43,750. Males had a median income of $26,250 versus $0 for females. The per capita income for the CDP was $17,605.

Business and recreation

Business 
There are several gas stations, two restaurants, and a private RV park/campground in Vantage. The Wild Horse Wind Farm, owned by Puget Sound Energy, is located on ridge tops near Vantage.

Recreation 
Vantage is known for Ginkgo Petrified Forest State Park and its associated Wanapum Recreational Area, as a base camp for those attending nearby Gorge Amphitheatre, and its rock climbing.

Rock climbing is one of the area's more popular forms of outdoor recreation and mostly takes place in "Echo Basin" (often mistaken for "Frenchman Coulee" which is the basin just north of Echo, on the other side of the Old Vantage Highway) on the basalt columns typical to the desert rimrock in the area.

Climbers started visiting as early as the 1950s and 1960s but the area was not popularized and publicized until the 1980s. With this came a great increase in route development. Today the area holds over 400 established routes (both traditionally protected and bolted) ranging in difficulty from 5.0-5.13c, and sees visitors almost year-round.

References

External links
 A Visitor's Guide for Vantage, Washington and the surrounding area

Census-designated places in Kittitas County, Washington
Census-designated places in Washington (state)
Washington (state) populated places on the Columbia River